Tom Parsons may refer to:

Tom Parsons (Gaelic footballer) (born 1988), Irish Gaelic football player
Tom Parsons (cricketer) (born 1987), British cricketer
Tom Parsons (rugby union) (born 1990), New Zealand rugby union player
Tom Parsons (high jumper) (born 1984), British athlete
Tom Parsons (baseball) (born 1939), American baseball pitcher
Tom Parsons (actor), British actor

See also
Thomas Parsons (disambiguation)